Rafael Nadal defeated Mariano Puerta in the final, 6–7(6–8), 6–3, 6–1, 7–5 to win the men's singles tennis title at the 2005 French Open. It was his first major title, the first of a record 14 French Open titles, and the first of a record 22 major men's singles titles overall. Nadal won the French Open on his tournament debut, the first man to do so since Mats Wilander in 1982, and was the youngest champion since Michael Chang in 1989, at 19 years and two days old when he won the title.

Gastón Gaudio was the defending champion, but lost in the fourth round to David Ferrer.

Roger Federer was attempting to complete the career Grand Slam, but was defeated in the semifinals by Nadal. It was the first of four consecutive years that Nadal would defeat Federer at the tournament; Federer would eventually complete the career Grand Slam in 2009.

This was the first French Open where future two-time champion Novak Djokovic competed, and marked the first time he won a major match. Future champion Stanislas Wawrinka also made his first appearance at a major, losing in the third round to Puerta. 1999 champion Andre Agassi made his last French Open appearance, losing a five-set match to Jarkko Nieminen in the first round.

Seeds

Qualifying

Draw

Finals

Top half

Section 1

Section 2

Section 3

Section 4

Bottom half

Section 5

Section 6

Section 7

Section 8

References

External links
Official Roland Garros 2005 Men's Singles Draw
Main Draw
Qualifying Draw
2005 French Open – Men's draws and results at the International Tennis Federation

Men's Singles
French Open by year – Men's singles
2005 ATP Tour